The following outline is provided as an overview of and topical guide to ancient India:

Ancient India is the Indian subcontinent from prehistoric times to the start of Medieval India, which is typically dated (when the term is still used) to the end of the Gupta Empire around 500 CE.  Depending on context, the term Ancient India might cover the modern-day countries of Sri Lanka, Bangladesh, India, Nepal and Pakistan, though these territories had large cultural differences.

General history of Ancient India 

An elaborate periodisation may be as follows:

Pre-history (Neolithic Age) (c. 8000–3500 BCE) 

 Indian Pre-history Age (c. 10,000–3300 BCE)
 Bhirrana culture   (7570–6200 BCE)
 Mehrgarh culture (c. 7000 –2500 BCE)

Bronze Age India (c. 3500–1750 BCE) 
 Indus Valley Civilisation (c. 3300–1300 BCE)
 Ahar–Banas culture (c. 3000–1500 BCE)
 Ochre Coloured Pottery culture (c. 2600–1200 BCE)
 Cemetery H culture (c. 1900–1300 BCE)
 Indian Civilizations on peak Indus Valley Civilisation & "First Urbanization " (c.  3300–1750 BCE);

Iron Age (c. 1750–345 BCE) 
 
Iron Age India (c. 1750–345 BCE)
Vedic civilization (c. 1500–600 BCE)
Black and red ware culture (c. 1450–700 BCE) in Western Ganges plain
Northern Black Polished Ware (c. 1200–500 BCE)
 Painted Grey Ware culture (c. 1200 or 700–300 BCE)
 Brihadratha dynasty (c. 1700–682 BCE)
 Gandhara Kingdom (c. 1500–545 BCE)
 Kuru Kingdom (c. 1200–345 BCE)
Indian Iron Age kingdoms (c. 600–345 BCE)
Pandyan Kingdom (c. 600 BCE–650 CE)
 Iron Age including Vedic period  (c. 1750–600 BCE);

Pre-Classical Period (c. 600 BCE–250 CE) 
 

Pradyota dynasty (c. 682–544 BCE)
Haryanka dynasty (c. 544–413 BCE)
Shaishunaga dynasty (c. 413–345 BCE)
Nanda Empire (c. 345–322 BCE)
Maurya Empire (c. 322–185 BCE)
Sangam period (c. 300 BCE–300 CE)
Pandyan Kingdom (c. 600 BCE–1650 CE)
Chera Kingdom (c. 300 BCE–1102 CE)
Chola Kingdom (c. 300 BCE–1279 CE)
Kalinga Empire (until 250 BCE)
Maha-Megha-Vahana Empire (c. 250 BCE–300 CE)
Satavahana Empire (230 BCE–220 CE)
Kuninda Kingdom (c. 250 BCE–350  CE)
Shunga Empire (c. 185–73 BCE)
Kanva dynasty (c. 73–26 BCE)
Indo-Greek Kingdom (180 BCE–10 CE)
Kanva Empire (75–26 BCE)
Kushan Empire (30–375 CE)
Indo-Scythian Kingdom ( c. 12 BCE–395 CE)

Classical Age (c. 250–500 CE) 
  
There are varying definitions of this period.

Gupta Empire (c. 320–650 CE)
Later Gupta dynasty (c. 490–750 CE)
Vakataka Empire (c. 250–500 CE)
Pallava Empire (c. 275–901 CE)
Kadamba dynasty (c. 345–1347 CE)
Western Ganga dynasty (c. 350–1024 CE)
Vishnukundina Empire (c. 420–624 CE)
Maitraka dynasty (c. 475–776 CE)	
Rai dynasty (c. 489–632 CE)

Culture in ancient India

Art in ancient India 
 Music in ancient India
 Carnatic music
 Hindustani music

Language in ancient India 
 Vedic Sanskrit
 Proto-Dravidian 
 (Scripts)
 Tamil-Brahmi
 Pallava script
 Gupta script
 Kadamba script

Religion in ancient India 
 History of Jainism
 History of Hinduism
 Historical Vedic religion
 Vedas
 Vedic mythology
 Vedic priesthood
 History of Buddhism

Sport in ancient India 

 Traditional games of India

Science and technology in ancient India 
Science and technology in ancient India
Indian mathematics
Indian astronomy
List of Indian inventions and discoveries
Indian martial arts
Malla-yuddha
Kalaripayattu
 Ancient Indian medicine
 Siddha medicine
 Ayurveda
Architecture
Dravidian architecture
Indian in Sanskrit epics

Organizations concerned with ancient India

Museums with ancient Indian exhibits 
 India (clockwise)
 National Museum, New Delhi
 Patna Museum
 Indian Museum, Kolkata
 Government Museum, Bangalore
 Goa State Museum
 Kutch Museum, Bhuj, Gujarat
 United Kingdom
 British Museum, London

See also

Notes

Subnotes

References

Sources

External links 

 Ancient India - The British Museum
 Ancient India - World History Encyclopedia
 TimeMaps Civilization: Ancient India

 
India
India